Eden is the sixth album by English soprano Sarah Brightman, released in 1998 under license by Nemo Studios to Angel Records.

Similar to Brightman's later album La Luna, Eden juxtaposed English popular songs with Italian opera arias. This was a departure from her previous albums which were almost entirely sung in English, such as Fly. Eden retained elements of Timeless, which had strongest classical influences.

Eden contains one classic rock interpretation, "Dust in the Wind". It was released as a single and experienced a big success in Brazil, because it was featured on the soundtrack of the soap opera Andando nas Nuvens (Walking on the Clouds). The single "Deliver Me" also gained certain mainstream American success because of its inclusion on the soundtrack of the 1999 film Brokedown Palace.

Subsequent to the release of Eden, Brightman performed her first world tour ever, One Night In Eden Tour, and released the VHS/DVD One Night in Eden.

Track listing

Singles
 "Eden" (1998)
 "Deliver Me" (1999)
 "So Many Things" (1999)
 "The Last Words You Said" (1999)
 "Dust in the Wind" (1999)

Charts and certifications

Charts

Certifications

References

Sarah Brightman albums
1998 albums
Albums produced by Frank Peterson
Albums produced by Richard Marx
East West Records albums
Classical crossover albums